Tarachand Goyal "Mechanic" is an Indian politician and member of the Bharatiya Janata Party. Goyal is a member of the Madhya Pradesh Legislative Assembly from the Tarana constituency in Ujjain district.

References 

People from Ujjain
Bharatiya Janata Party politicians from Madhya Pradesh
Madhya Pradesh MLAs 2003–2008
Living people
21st-century Indian politicians
Year of birth missing (living people)